In organic chemistry, free-radical halogenation is a type of halogenation. This chemical reaction is typical of alkanes and alkyl-substituted aromatics under application of UV light. The reaction is used for the industrial synthesis of chloroform (CHCl3), dichloromethane (CH2Cl2), and hexachlorobutadiene. It proceeds by a free-radical chain mechanism.

General mechanism

The chain mechanism is as follows, using the chlorination of methane as a usual example:
1. Initiation: Splitting or homolysis of a chlorine molecule to form two chlorine atoms, initiated by ultraviolet radiation . A chlorine atom has an unpaired electron and acts as a free radical.

2. chain propagation (two steps): a hydrogen atom is pulled off from methane leaving a primary methyl radical. The methyl radical then pulls a Cl• from Cl2.

This results in the desired product plus another chlorine radical. This radical will then go on to take part in another propagation reaction causing a chain reaction. If there is sufficient chlorine, other products such as CH2Cl2 may be formed.
3. chain termination: recombination of two free radicals:

The last possibility in the termination step will result in an impurity in the final mixture; notably this results in an organic molecule with a longer carbon chain than the reactants.

The net reaction is:

The rate law for this process is k[CH4][Cl2]. This can be shown using the steady-state approximation.

In the case of methane or ethane, all the hydrogen atoms are equivalent and thus have an equal chance of being replaced. This leads to what is known as a statistical product distribution. For propane and higher alkanes, the hydrogen atoms which form part of CH2 (or CH) groups are preferentially replaced.

The reactivity of the different halogens varies considerably. The relative rates are: fluorine (108) > chlorine (1) > bromine > iodine. Hence, the reaction of alkanes with fluorine is difficult to control, that with chlorine is moderate to fast, that with bromine is slow and requires high levels of UV irradiation while the reaction with iodine is practically nonexistent and thermodynamically unfavorable.

A common method in organic synthesis employing is the Wohl–Ziegler reaction, which employs N-bromosuccinimide, which can undergo homolysis to yield a bromine radical and is a free-radical halogenation variant.

Control of halogenation 

Halogenation often does not stop at monosubstitution. Depending on reaction conditions, the chlorination of methane yields dichloromethane, chloroform and carbon tetrachloride.
In most hydrocarbons, more than one possible product exists depending on which hydrogen is replaced. Butane (CH3−CH2−CH2−CH3), for example, can be chlorinated at the "1" position to give 1-chlorobutane (CH3−CH2−CH2−CH2Cl) or at the "2" position to give 2-chlorobutane (CH3−CH2−CHCl−CH3). The product distribution depends on relative reaction rates: in this case the "2" position of butane reacts faster and 2-chlorobutane is the major product.
Chlorination is generally less selective than bromination. Fluorination is not only even less selective than chlorination, but also highly exothermic and care must be taken to prevent an explosion or a runaway reaction. This relationship is often used as a demonstration of the reactivity–selectivity principle and can be explained with the aid of the Hammond postulate. A bromine radical is not very reactive and the transition state for hydrogen abstraction has much radical character and is reached late. The reactive chlorine radical develops a transition state resembling the reactant with little radical character. When the alkyl radical is fully formed in the transition state, it can benefit fully from any resonance stabilization present thereby maximizing selectivity.
Bond dissociation energies (BDEs) can be used to understand the selectivity of bromination. The BDE of a bond is the energy required to break it by homolytic cleavage, and these values can be used to determine if a reaction or step in a reaction is exothermic or endothermic. In a chain reaction step of a Br radical reacting with a hydrogen on a secondary carbon to cleave the H−C bond requires 397 kJ/mol and an H−Br is formed. We can look at the BDE of H−Br (366 kJ/mol) and subtract this value from 397 kJ/mol to get +31 kJ/mol. This positive value tells us that this step in the reaction requires energy (endothermic) and the reactants are more stable than the products. Comparing this with the same situation of a Cl radical we see that this step is exothermic (397 − 431 kJ/mol = −34 kJ/mol). From these values, we can conclude that in bromination it is more important that the most stable radical (tertiary) be formed during this step and thus it is more selective than chlorination. This is because the formation of H–Br and the tertiary radical is less endothermic (380 − 366 kJ/mol = +14 kJ/mol). This value is 17 kJ/mol less than the secondary radical formation. Iodine does not even participate in free-radical halogenation because the entire reaction is endothermic.
It is possible to predict the product distribution of different monochloro derivatives resulting from the chlorination of an alkane with non-equivalent hydrogens. From experimentation, it has been determined that the relative rates of chlorination to primary, secondary, and tertiary positions are 1, 3.8, and 5 respectively (this ratio is used in the example following this paragraph). This corresponds with alkyl radical stability: tertiary radical species are more stable than secondary radical species, and secondary radical species are more stable than primary radical species—thus any single chlorination will favor substitution at the most substituted carbon. Because of this trend, the percentages of each product formed from the parent radical can be estimated with relatively high accuracy. For example, 2-methyl butane ((CH3)2CHCH2CH3) exhibits the following results:-

For clarity, the unique hydrogens will be labeled as follows:
a = (CH3)2 (primary),  b = CH (tertiary),  c = CH2 (secondary), d = CH3 (also primary)
Applying the aforementioned substitution ratios in the formula: ([number of hydrogens] × [ratio factor]) / [(primary hydrogens × 1) + (secondary hydrogens × 3.8) + (tertiary hydrogens × 5)]
{|
|a: 6 × 1  = 6 ||   || a =  = 28%
|-
|b: 1 × 5  = 5 ||   || b =  = 23%
|-
|c: 2 × 3.8 = 7.6 ||   || c =  = 35%
|-
|d: 3 × 1  = 3 ||   || d =  = 14%
|}
 Denominator total for this species = 6 + 5 + 7.6 + 3 = 21.6

Because all six "a" hydrogens, both "c" hydrogens, and the three "d" hydrogens are chemically equivalent with the others in their three classifications (i.e., any "a" hydrogen is equivalent with any other "a" hydrogen), these rates accurately reflect where a single chlorination may take place for 2-methylbutane.  The single tertiary hydrogen "b" is nearly as susceptible as the six primary "a" hydrogens, and almost doubly susceptible as any of the three, also primary "d" hydrogens, illustrating the radical stability differences between tertiary and primary hydrogens (the secondary "c" hydrogens also follow the radical stability order as previously mentioned).

Free-radical iodination is usually not possible because iodine is too unreactive to form a radical. For the other halogens, free-radical halogenation generally proceeds in the following order:
Carbons with one or more aryl substituents (benzylic positions) react faster than:
Carbons with three alkyl substituents (tertiary positions), which react faster than:
Carbons with two alkyl substituents (secondary positions), which react faster than:
Carbons with one or zero substituents (primary positions)

Oxygen is a halogenation inhibitor.

An example of radical bromination of toluene is given below:

This reaction takes place on water instead of an organic solvent and the bromine is obtained by oxidation of hydrobromic acid with hydrogen peroxide. An incandescent light bulb is sufficient for bromine radical generation.

See also
 Radical fluorination

References

Free radical reactions
Halogenation reactions